Dichnya is a rural locality (a selo) and the administrative center of Dichnyansky Selsoviet Rural Settlement, Kurchatovsky District, Kursk Oblast, Russia. Population:

Geography 
The selo is located on the Dichnya River (a tributary of the Seym River), 33 km south-west of Kursk, 5 km east of the district center – the town Kurchatov. Dichnya is 154 m above sea level.

 Climate
Dichnya has a warm-summer humid continental climate (Dfb in the Köppen climate classification).

Transport 
Dichnya is located 23 km from the federal route  Crimea Highway, on the road of regional importance  (Kursk – Lgov – Rylsk – border with Ukraine), 8.5 km from the road  (M2 – Ivanino), on the road of intermunicipal significance  (38K-017 – Lukashevka), in the immediate vicinity of the railway halt 433 km (railway line Lgov I — Kursk).

The rural locality is situated 40 km from Kursk Vostochny Airport, 126 km from Belgorod International Airport and 242 km from Voronezh Peter the Great Airport.

References

Notes

Sources

Rural localities in Kurchatovsky District, Kursk Oblast